Cultus Ferox (Latin: "savage way of life") is a German medieval rock band, formed in winter 2001. Their music consists of many traditional pieces adapted with some modern styling.

They have toured Germany, and in 2007, they were part of the line-up for the M'era Luna Festival. 
2010 play Cultus Ferox at Hörnerfest, Brande-Hörnerkirchen/Germany and at the Crana Historica in Kronach/Germany.

Discography 
 Wiederkehr, 2003
 Weihnachtstänze, 2003
 Flamme des Meeres, 2003
 Aufbruch, 2005
 Fernweh, 2006
 Unbeugsam, 2006
 Rumtour, 2007
 Beutezug, 2013
 Nette Jungs, 2015

References 

[ Cultus Ferox] at Allmusic

External links 

 Label site
 Band discography

German rock music groups